Allison Blakely is an academic historian.

Life
He graduated from the University of Oregon, and from the University of California, Berkeley with an M.A. and Ph.D.
He taught for thirty years at Howard University 1971–2001. He has taught at Boston University since 2001.

From 2006 to 2009 he was President of the Phi Beta Kappa society.

Awards
 1988 American Book Award
 Woodrow Wilson Fellowship
 Mellon Fellowship
 Fulbright-Hays Fellowship
 Ford Foundation Fellowship

Works

References

Living people
21st-century American historians
University of Oregon alumni
University of California, Berkeley alumni
Howard University faculty
Boston University faculty
American Book Award winners
Year of birth missing (living people)